Michael Young (born 26 March 1958) is an Australian judoka. He competed at the 1980 Summer Olympics and the 1984 Summer Olympics.

References

External links
 

1958 births
Living people
Australian male judoka
Olympic judoka of Australia
Judoka at the 1980 Summer Olympics
Judoka at the 1984 Summer Olympics
Place of birth missing (living people)